Hayapuga Rural LLG a local-level government (LLG) of Koroba-Kopiago District in Hela Province, Papua New Guinea.

Wards
01. Hare
02. Munima / Wenani
03. Tani Walete / Taunda
04. Halimbu
05. Tobani / Halimbu 2
06. Hambuari
07. Linabeni
08. Peri
09. Kutama
10. Tindima
11. Hiwanda
12. Mindiratogo / Hiwanda 2
13. Telabo
14. Hapono
15. Undupi
16. Gugubalu / Hundupi
17. Warolo
18. Teni (Hundupi)
19. Agau / Teni 2
20. Idauwi / Teni 3
21. Yapira / Idawi

References 

Local-level governments of Hela Province